The following are people who were either born, raised, or have lived for a significant period of time in the U.S. state of Oklahoma.

Actors, directors, screenwriters, and producers
A–M

Lexi Ainsworth (born 1992), actress (General Hospital)
Suzy Amis (born 1962), actress
Erika Anderson (born 1963), actress
Lou Antonio (born 1934), actor
Royce D. Applegate (1939–2003), actor (seaQuest DSV)
Gene Autry (1907–1998), actor, musician, Major League Baseball team owner
Nicki Aycox (1975-2022), actress (Cold Case)
Marshall Bell (born 1942), actor (G vs E)
William Boyd (1895–1972), actor (Hopalong Cassidy)
Gary Busey (born 1944), actor (The Buddy Holly Story)
T. V. Carpio (born 1981), actress, singer
Irene Champlin (1931–1990), actress (Flash Gordon)
Greyson Chance (born 1997), singer
Lon Chaney Jr (1906–1973), actor (The Wolf Man, Of Mice and Men)
Lonny Chapman (1920–2007), actor 
Maree Cheatham (born 1942), actress (Days of Our Lives)
Kristin Chenoweth (born 1968), Tony Award-winning actress (Wicked)
Danny Cooksey (born 1975), actor, voice actor (Diff'rent Strokes)
Candy Clark (born 1947), actress (American Graffiti)
Larry Clark (born 1943), filmmaker (Kids, Ken Park), photographer
Patrick Cranshaw (1919–2005), actor (AfterMASH)
Joan Crawford (1906–1977), Academy Award-winning actress
Burr DeBenning (1936–2003), actor
Michael Dolan (born 1965), actor
Richard Erdman (1925–2019), actor
Blake Edwards (1922–2010), director, writer, producer, The Pink Panther, Breakfast at Tiffany's
Glenda Farrell (1904–1971), actress (Torchy Blane)
Kay Francis (1905–1968), actress
James Garner (1928–2014), actor (The Rockford Files, Maverick, The Great Escape, The Notebook)
Bill Hader (born 1978), actor, writer, comedian (SNL)
Sterlin Harjo (born 1979) Native American filmmaker
Van Heflin (1908–1971), Academy Award-winning actor
Mark Holton (born 1958), actor
Darla Hood (1931–1979), actress (Darla from The Little Rascals), Leedey
Clint Howard (born 1959), actor (brother of Ron Howard)
Jean Speegle Howard (1927–2000), actress, mother of Ron Howard
Rance Howard (1928–2017), actor, father of Ron and Clint Howard
Ron Howard (born 1954), director, producer, actor
Ben Johnson (1918–1996), Academy Award-winning actor
Jennifer Jones (1919–2009), actress (The Towering Inferno, Duel in the Sun)
Olivia Jordan (born 1988), actress, beauty pageant winner
Christian Kane (born 1974), actor, singer (Leverage)
Wright King (1923–2018), actor, native of Okmulgee 
Heather Langenkamp (born 1964), actress (A Nightmare on Elm Street)
Jason London (born 1972), actor (Wildfire)
Dick Lowry (born 1944), director
Thad Luckinbill (born 1975), actor (The Young and the Restless)
Terrence Malick (born 1943), film director
April March (born 1935), burlesque dancer
James Marsden (born 1973), actor (X-Men)
Rue McClanahan (1934–2010), actress (The Golden Girls)
Hayley McFarland (born 1991), actress (Lie to Me)
Beverlee McKinsey (1938–2008), soap-opera actress
Ryan Merriman (born 1983), actor (The Pretender)
Vera Miles (born 1929), actress (The Searchers, Psycho) 
Sharron Miller Emmy winning director, writer, producer
Tom Mix (1880-1940), cowboy star of silent films 
Megan Mullally (born 1958), actress, dancer, singer (Will & Grace)
Olivia Munn (born 1980), actress, television personality (The Daily Show, The Newsroom)

N–Z

Clarence Nash (1904–1985), voice of Donald Duck
Tim Blake Nelson (born 1964), actor, director (O Brother, Where Art Thou?, The Grey Zone)
Chuck Norris (born 1940), actor, martial artist (Walker, Texas Ranger)
 Kelli O'Hara (born 1976), Broadway actress
Lee Pace (born 1979), actor, The Hobbit: The Desolation of Smaug
Kinga Philipps (born 1976), actress, television personality
Cindy Pickett (born 1947), actress (St. Elsewhere, Ferris Bueller's Day Off)
Brad Pitt (born 1963), actor and producer
Mary Kay Place (born 1947), actress (The Big Chill)
Wiley Post (1898–1935), pilot, the first to travel around the world solo
Megyn Price (born 1971), actress (Rules of Engagement)
Tony Randall (1920–2004), actor (The Odd Couple)
Erik Rhodes (1906–1990), actor, singer
Dale Robertson (1923–2013), film and television actor; later rancher near Yukon, Oklahoma
Will Rogers (1875–1935), actor, columnist, radio personality
Chelcie Ross (born 1942), actor
Will Sampson (1933–1987), artist, actor (One Flew Over the Cuckoo's Nest)
Gailard Sartain (born 1946), actor, artist, comedian (Hee Haw, The Buddy Holly Story)
Tobe Sexton (born 1968), actor, filmmaker, singer, dancer (Freddy's Dead: The Final Nightmare, Offerings)
Ted Shackelford (born 1946), actor (Knots Landing)
Paul Sparks (born 1971), actor (Boardwalk Empire, House of Cards)
G. D. Spradlin (1920–2011), actor (The Godfather Part II)
Lauren Stamile (born 1976), actress (Grey's Anatomy)
Wes Studi (born 1947), actor (Dances with Wolves, Avatar)
Maria Tallchief (1925–2013), ballerina
Paula Trickey (born 1966), actress (Pacific Blue)
Jeanne Tripplehorn (born 1963), actress (Basic Instinct, Big Love)
Countess Vaughn (born 1978), actress (The Parkers)
Heather Wahlquist (born 1977), actress
Susan Watson (born 1938), actress
Randy Wayne (born 1981), actor
Dennis Weaver (1924–2006), actor (Gunsmoke, McCloud)
Elmo Williams (1913–2015), Academy Award-winning film editor
Michael Wilson (1914–1978), Academy Award-winning screenwriter
Alfre Woodard (born 1952), Academy Award-nominated, Golden Globe Award-winning actress
Gretchen Wyler (1932–2007), actress

Athletes

A–G

Lane Adams (born 1989), outfielder for the Atlanta Braves
Xavier Adibi (born 1984), linebacker for Houston Texans
Troy Aikman (born 1966), quarterback, OU, UCLA and Dallas Cowboys, Pro Football Hall of Fame inductee, sportscaster
Brent Albright (born 1978), professional wrestler
Brett Anderson (born 1988), pitcher for the Oakland Athletics
Mark Anderson (born 1983), defensive end for the Buffalo Bills
Kelenna Azubuike (born 1983), shooting guard/small forward for the New York Knicks
David Baas (born 1981), guard and center for New York Giants
Alvin Bailey (born 1991), offensive lineman for the Seattle Seahawks
Dan Bailey (born 1988), placekicker for Dallas Cowboys
Billy Bajema (born 1982), tight end for Baltimore Ravens
Jeff Banister (born 1964), MLB catcher, manager of Texas Rangers
Dallas Beeler (born 1989), pitcher for Chicago Cubs
Christopher Bell (born 1994), NASCAR Cup Series driver
Johnny Bench (born 1947), MLB catcher for Cincinnati Reds, member Baseball Hall of Fame
Al Benton (1911–1968), MLB pitcher
Tanner Berryhill (born 1993), Monster Energy NASCAR Cup Series driver
Nick Blackburn (born 1982), starting pitcher for Minnesota Twins
Douglas Blubaugh (1934–2011), Olympic gold medalist in freestyle wrestling
Brian Bosworth (born 1965), OU and NFL player
Sam Bradford (born 1987), football quarterback, OU and Minnesota Vikings
Archie Bradley (born 1992), pitcher for the Arizona Diamondbacks
Jack Brisco (1941–2010), professional wrestler
Jerry Brisco (born 1946), professional wrestler
Louise Brough (1923–2014), Hall of Fame tennis player
Josh Brown (born 1979), placekicker for New York Giants
Mike Brumley (born 1963), third base coach for Seattle Mariners
Ryan Budde (born 1979), catcher for Arizona Diamondbacks
Bruce Buffer (born 1957), Octagon announcer for UFC main events
Mikey Burnett (born 1974), UFC fighter
Sol Butler (1895–1954), athlete who competed in football and track and field
Patrick Callan (born 1999), competitive swimmer
Joe Carter (born 1960), Major League Baseball outfielder
Sherri Coale (born 1965), women's basketball coach at OU
Charles Coe (1923–2001), U.S. Amateur golfer, won seven titles
Larry Coker (born 1948), football coach at University of Miami
Nick Cole (born 1984), guard for Philadelphia Eagles
Nadia Comăneci (born 1961), Five-time Olympic gold medalist gymnast
Bart Conner (born 1958), Olympic gold medal gymnast
Riley Cooper (born 1987), wide receiver for Philadelphia Eagles
Bobby Cox (born 1941), Baseball Hall of Fame manager for Atlanta Braves
Kendall Cross (born 1968), Olympic gold medalist in freestyle wrestling 
Harold DeMarsh (1902–1982), first ever NCAA Wrestling champion
Don Demeter (born 1935), Major League Baseball outfielder
Phillip Dillard (born 1986), linebacker for UFL's Omaha Nighthawks
Jay Thomas Evans (1931–2008), Olympic silver medalist in freestyle wrestling
Tim Flannery (born 1957), MLB infielder and coach
Ross Flood (1910–1995), Olympic silver medalist in freestyle wrestling
Brian Flynn (born 1990), pitcher for Kansas City Royals
Ryan Franklin (born 1977), pitcher for Baltimore Orioles
Dominique Franks (born 1987), cornerback for Atlanta Falcons                             
Edward C. Gallagher (1887–1940) champion OSU sprinter and football player, track and wrestling coach; winningest wrestling coach in NCAA history, 11 NCAA titles, Olympic wrestling coach, National Wrestling Hall of Fame charter member
Vickie Gates (born 1962), IFBB professional bodybuilder
Koda Glover (born 1993), pitcher for Washington Nationals
Bill Goldberg (born 1966), professional NFL football player and undefeated professional wrestler
Kelly Gregg (born 1976), OU and NFL player
Jermaine Gresham (born 1988), tight end for Arizona Cardinals
Matt Grice (born 1981), UFC fighter
Blake Griffin (born 1989), power forward for Detroit Pistons
Taylor Griffin (born 1986), pro basketball player

H–M

Charlie Haas (born 1972), WWE professional wrestler
Tommy Hanson (1986–2015), MLB starting pitcher, primarily with Atlanta Braves
Chris Harris Jr. (born 1989), cornerback for Denver Broncos
Mickey Hatcher (born 1955), OU baseball, outfielder for Los Angeles Dodgers and Minnesota Twins
Andrew Heaney (born 1991), relief pitcher for Los Angeles Angels
Ryan Helsley (born 1994), relief pitcher for St. Louis Cardinals
Johny Hendricks (born 1983), former UFC Welterweight Champion, two-time NCAA Wrestling champion
Josiah Henson (1922–2012), Olympic bronze medalist in freestyle wrestling
Rusty Hilger (1962–2019), OSU and NFL quarterback
A. J. Hinch (born 1974), MLB catcher, manager of the Houston Astros
Danny Hodge (1932–2020), NCAA champion and Olympic silver medalist wrestler, 
Mat Hoffman (born 1972), world champion BMX biker
Matt Holliday (born 1980), designated hitter for the New York Yankees
Henry Iba (1904–1993), OSU NCAA champion and Olympic champion basketball coach, Basketball Hall of Fame member
Gabe Ikard (born 1990), center for Buffalo Bills
Darnell Jackson (born 1985), forward for Sacramento Kings
Betty Jameson (1919–2009), golfer in World Golf Hall of Fame
Charlie Johnson (born 1984), guard for Minnesota Vikings
Felix Jones (born 1987), running back for Dallas Cowboys
Bob Kalsu (1945–1970), Oklahoma Sooners football and Buffalo Bills player, only active professional football player killed in Vietnam War
Deji Karim (born 1986), running back for Jacksonville Jaguars
Matt Kemp (born 1984), MLB outfielder
Dallas Keuchel (born 1988), pitcher for Atlanta Braves
Stacey King (born 1967), three-time NBA champion with Chicago Bulls (1991–1993)
Jon Kolb (born 1947), football player, Oklahoma State and Pittsburgh Steelers center
Hal Lahar (1919–2003), pro football player, college coach
Steve Largent (born 1954), Seattle Seahawks wide receiver, Pro Football Hall of Famer and politician
Abe Lemons (1922–2002), Oklahoma City University, Pan American University, and Texas Longhorns basketball coach
Frank Lewis (1912–1998), Olympic gold medalist in freestyle wrestling
Ronnell Lewis (born 1990), NFL player for Detroit Lions
Joe Lillard (1905–1978), running back for Chicago Cardinals
Ray Mallouf (1918–2008), NFL quarterback and punter for Chicago Cardinals and New York Giants
Mickey Mantle (1931–1995), New York Yankees outfielder, Baseball Hall of Famer
Pepper Martin (1904–1965), St. Louis Cardinals baseball player
Bryan McCann (born 1987), cornerback for Oakland Raiders
Gerald McCoy (born 1988), defensive tackle for Tampa Bay Buccaneers
"Jumping Jack" McCracken (1911–1958), Basketball Hall of Famer
Tyrus McGee (born 1991), basketball player in the Israel Basketball Premier League
Leroy McGuirk (1910–1988), professional wrestler and promoter
Mike McGuirk (born 1958), ring announcer for World Wrestling Federation
R. W. McQuarters (born 1976), NFL cornerback
Robert Meachem (born 1984), wide receiver for San Diego Chargers
Jordy Mercer (born 1986), shortstop for Pittsburgh Pirates
Shannon Miller (born 1977), Olympic gold medal gymnast
Garrett Mills (born 1983), tight end for Philadelphia Eagles
Ryan Minor (born 1974), OU baseball and basketball player
Kenny Monday (born 1961), Olympic gold and silver medalist in freestyle wrestling
Gil Morgan (born 1946), professional golfer
Marty Mornhinweg (born 1962), offensive coordinator for Philadelphia Eagles
Tommy Morrison (1969–2013), heavyweight champion boxer
Bobby Murcer (1946–2008), professional baseball player and sportscaster

N–R

Rico Noel (born 1989), outfielder for New York Yankees
Lance Norick (born 1968), NASCAR driver
Daniel Orton (born 1990), center for Orlando Magic
Bill Owen (1903–1975), NFL offensive tackle
Steve Owen (1898–1964), Hall of Fame NFL player and head coach
Steve Owens (born 1947), OU football player, 1969 Heisman Trophy winner
Robert Pearce (1908–1996), Olympic gold medalist in freestyle wrestling
Brad Penny (born 1978), MLB pitcher
Beth Phoenix (born 1980), professional wrestler
Darrell Porter (1952–2002), MLB baseball player for St. Louis Cardinals
Maurkice Pouncey (born 1989), center for Pittsburgh Steelers
Mike Pouncey (born 1989), center and guard for Miami Dolphins
Mark Price (born 1964), basketball player; Enid H.S., Georgia Tech, and Cleveland Cavaliers
 J. T. Realmuto (born 1991), MLB player for the Philadelphia Phillies
Bryant Reeves (born 1973), basketball player, played for Oklahoma State and NBA's Vancouver Grizzlies
Allie Reynolds (1917–1994), pitcher, Baseball Hall of Famer
Crystal Robinson (born 1974), New York Liberty, WNBA basketball player
Bullet Rogan (1893–1967), Baseball Hall of Famer
Matt Roney (born 1980), MLB relief pitcher
Jim Ross (born 1952), WWE announcer
Darrell Royal (1924–2012), football coach at Texas, College Football Hall of Fame
T. J. Rushing (born 1983), cornerback and return specialist for Detroit Lions
John Russell (born 1961), bench coach for Baltimore Orioles
Rex Ryan (born 1962), head coach for Buffalo Bills, New York Jets
Rob Ryan (born 1962), NFL defensive coordinator

S–Z

Barry Sanders (born 1968), running back, OSU Heisman Trophy winner, Pro Football Hall of Famer
Spec Sanders (1919–2003), football player for New York Yankees (AAFC) and New York Yanks
Bill Self (born 1962), basketball coach at University of Kansas
Lee Roy Selmon (1954–2011), OU and NFL player, Pro Football Hall of Fame
Sterling Shepard (born 1993), wide receiver for the New York Giants 
Jeremy Shockey (born 1980), tight end for New Orleans Saints
Billy Sims (born 1955), running back OU and Detroit Lions, Heisman Trophy winner
Antonio Smith (born 1981), defensive end for Denver Broncos
John Smith (born 1965), two-time NCAA champion at OSU, four-time World and two-time Olympic gold medalist, NCAA and Olympic wrestling coach, Distinguished Member of National Wrestling Hall of Fame
Pat Smith (born 1970), younger brother of John Smith, first ever four-time NCAA Wrestling champion
Reggie Smith (born 1986), safety for Carolina Panthers
Warren Spahn (1921–2003), pitcher, Baseball Hall of Famer
Willie Stargell (1940–2001), outfielder, Baseball Hall of Famer with Pittsburgh Pirates
John Starks (born 1965), basketball player for New York Knicks
Cory Sullivan (born 1979), outfielder for Houston Astros
Eddie Sutton (1936–2020), Arkansas and OSU basketball coach
Jack Swagger (born 1982), OU and WWE professional wrestler
Barry Switzer (born 1937), football coach, OU and Dallas Cowboys
Brian Tallet (born 1977), relief pitcher for St. Louis Cardinals
Ralph Terry (born 1936), pitcher, primarily with New York Yankees
Jim Thorpe (1887–1953), athlete, Olympic gold medalist, played professional football and Major League Baseball; born in Prague, Oklahoma
Spencer Tillman (born 1964), All-American running back for OU, TV analyst
Wayman Tisdale (1964–2009), professional basketball player and jazz musician
Bob Tway (born 1959), professional golfer, 1986 PGA Championship winner
Kevin Tway (born 1988), professional golfer
Ekpe Udoh (born 1987), player for Milwaukee Bucks
Jack van Bebber (1907–1986), Olympic gold medalist in freestyle wrestling
J. D. Walton (born 1987), center for New York Giants
Lloyd "Little Poison" Waner (1906–1982), Baseball Hall of Famer
Paul "Big Poison" Waner (1903–1965), Baseball Hall of Famer
"Cowboy" Bill Watts (born 1939), professional wrestler and promoter
J.C. Watts (born 1957), OU quarterback and U.S. Congressman
Brandon Weeden (born 1983), quarterback for Houston Texans
Wes Welker (born 1981), wide receiver for Denver Broncos
Wayne Wells (born 1946), Olympic gold medalist in freestyle wrestling, first ever Nike signature athlete
Jason White (born 1980), OU quarterback, Heisman Trophy winner
Bud Wilkinson (1916–1994), OU coach, College Football Hall of Fame
Shelby Wilson (born 1937), Olympic gold medalist in freestyle wrestling
Shelden Williams (born 1983), former NBA player
Reggie Willits (born 1981), left fielder for Los Angeles Angels
Matt Wiman (born 1983), UFC fighter
James Winchester (born 1989), long snapper for Kansas City Chiefs
Jamey Wright (born 1974), MLB relief pitcher
Kenyatta Wright (born 1978), NFL linebacker from Vian, Oklahoma
Trae Young (born 1998), NBA All-Star point guard for the Atlanta Hawks

Authors

William Bernhardt (born 1960), novelist
John Berryman (1914–1972), poet
Ralph Ellison (1914–1994), writer and scholar
Martin Gardner (1914–2010), author specializing in recreational mathematics
Tony Hillerman (1925–2008), journalist, historian, professor, and novelist
S.E. Hinton (born 1948), author and novelist
Nicole Jordan (born 1954), author
Louis L'Amour (1908–1988), western novelist
Billie Letts (1938–2014), novelist
Tracy Letts (born 1965), playwright, screenwriter, actor
N. Scott Momaday (born 1964), author, printmaker
Bill Moyers (born 1934), journalist and public commentator
Jason Nelson (born 1970), internet artist and digital poet
Wilson Rawls (1913–1984), author
Jeff Rowland (born 1974), cartoonist, author of WIGU
Josh Shipp (born 1981), author and motivational speaker
Jim Thompson (1906–1977), novelist

Aviators and astronauts

 Thomas and Paul Braniff, airline entrepreneurs, founders of Braniff International Airways
Gordon Cooper (1927–2006), astronaut
Owen K. Garriott (1930–2019), astronaut
John Herrington (Chickasaw, born 1958), astronaut
James Jabara (1923–1966) world's first jet ace, and Korean War triple ace with 15 kills
Shannon Lucid (born 1943), astronaut
William R. Pogue (1930–2014), astronaut
Wiley Post (1898–1935), first pilot to fly solo around the world (born in Texas but grew up in Oklahoma)
Will Rogers (Cherokee, 1879–1935), aviator
Thomas Stafford (born 1930), astronaut
Clarence L. Tinker (Osage, 1887–1942), U.S. Army Air Corps general and supreme commander of the U.S. Army Air Corps in the Pacific during World War II

Businesspeople

Rick Bayless (born 1953), restaurateur, chef, PBS television personality
Clay Bennett (born 1959), chairman, Dorchester Capital; owner, Oklahoma City Thunder
Sherman Billingsley (1896–1966), owner of Stork Club
James A. Chapman (1881–1966), oil industry businessman
Edward K. Gaylord (1873–1974), founder, Daily Oklahoman
Edward L. Gaylord (1919–2003), editor, Daily Oklahoman; founder, TNN & CMT; owner, Grand Ole Opry
Sylvan Goldman (1898–1984), businessman and inventor of the shopping cart
David Green (born 1941), businessman, philanthropist, founder of Hobby Lobby
J. M. Hall (1851–1935), merchant and pioneer of Tulsa, Oklahoma
George Kaiser (born 1942), chairman of BOK Financial Corporation
W. W. Keeler (Cherokee, 1908–1987), principal Chief of Cherokee Nation, President and CEO of Phillips Petroleum Company (1968–1973)
Henry Kravis (born 1944), co-founder of Kohlberg Kravis Roberts & Co.
Eugene Lorton (1868–1949), owner, publisher and editor of Tulsa World
James H. McBirney (1870–1944) founder and president, National Bank of Commerce, 
Sam P. McBirney (1877–1936), founder and vice president, National Bank of Commerce, Tulsa
Robert M. McFarlin (1866–1942), oil industry businessman
Neal Patterson (1949–2017), chief executive officer, Cerner Corporation; owner, Sporting Kansas City soccer team
Waite Phillips (1883–1964), oil industry businessman
T. Boone Pickens Jr. (1928–2019), oil industry businessman
Chad Richison (born 1970), founder and CEO of Paycom
William Skelly (1878–1957), founder of Skelly Oil Company and Spartan School of Aeronautics
B. Kevin Turner (born 1965), Former COO of Microsoft, CEO of Sam's Club and CIO of Walmart
Helen Walton (1919–2007), wife of Sam Walton, once richest woman in the world
Sam Walton (1918–1992), founder of Wal-Mart
Tom L. Ward, oil industry businessman
William K. Warren, Sr. (1897–1990), oil industry businessman, founder of Warren Petroleum and St. Francis Hospital in Tulsa

Comedians

Bill Hader (born 1978), actor, producer, director, writer comedian
Megan Mullally (born 1958), actress, comedian, dancer, singer
Alexander Posey (Muscogee Creek, 1873–1908) poet, humorist, politician
Tony Randall (1920–2004), actor, comedian
Will Rogers (Cherokee, 1879–1935), humorist
Harris Wittels (1984–2015) television writer, comedian

Criminals

Cattle Annie (1882–1978), female bandit of the American Old West
Little Britches (born 1879; year of death unknown), female bandit, companion in crime with Cattle Annie
William K. "Bill" Hale (1874–1962), ringleader of the Osage Indian murders, convicted of murder in 1929
Chelsea Manning (born 1987), U.S. Army intelligence analyst convicted by court-martial of violations of the Espionage Act and other offenses
Richard Lee McNair (born 1958), convicted murderer
Timothy McVeigh (1968–2001), domestic terrorist, convinced for Oklahoma City Bombing and put to death in 2001
Jon Schillaci (born 1971), former FBI Ten Most Wanted Fugitive
Belle Starr (1848–1889), queen of the outlaws; a female Jesse James
Cameron Willingham (1968–2004), convicted arsonist, whose case spawned a controversy over use of forensic evidence in capital trials

Miss America winners

Jennifer Berry (born 1983), Miss America 2006
Jane Anne Jayroe (born 1946), Miss America 1967
Lauren Nelson (born 1987), Miss America 2007
Susan Powell (born 1959), Miss America 1981
Norma Smallwood (Cherokee, 1909–1966), Miss America 1926, first Miss America of Native American heritage 
Shawntel Smith (born 1971), Miss America 1996

Military and political figures

Carl Albert (1908–2000), Speaker of the United States House of Representatives from 1971 to 1977; born in McAlester, reared in Bugtussle, Oklahoma
Bob Ballinger (born 1974), Republican member of the Arkansas House of Representatives; reared in Tulsa 
Dewey F. Bartlett, Sr. (1919–1979), Oklahoma Governor and U.S. Senator
Dan Boren (born 1973), represents Oklahoma's 2nd Congressional district in the U.S. House
David Boren (born 1941), former Governor of Oklahoma, U.S. Senator and University of Oklahoma president
Donna Campbell (born 1954), physician and member of the Texas Senate; reared in Oklahoma
Joseph J. Clark (Cherokee, 1893–1971), Admiral U.S. Navy and first Native American to graduate from the United States Naval Academy
William J. Crowe (1925–2007), Admiral U.S. Navy and former Chairman of the U.S. Joint Chiefs of Staff
Drew Edmondson (born 1946), state Attorney General
General Tommy Franks (born 1945), Commander of US Central Command, US Invasions of Afghanistan and Iraq
Bo Gritz (born 1939), most decorated Green Beret officer during the Vietnam War
Enoch Kelly Haney (Seminole, born 1940), Senator State of Oklahoma, campaign manager for George Nigh during his first successful bid for Governor, Principal Chief of the Seminole Nation of Oklahoma, artist, sculptor, historian, businessman
Patrick J. Hurley (1883–1963), U.S. Secretary of War under President Herbert Hoover
Jeane Kirkpatrick (1926–2006), U.S. Ambassador to the United Nations
William Flynn Martin (born 1950), Deputy Secretary of Energy and Executive Secretary of the United States National Security Council
Perle Mesta (1889–1975), political hostess, U.S. Ambassador to Luxembourg
A. S. Mike Monroney (1902–1980), U.S. Senator, sponsor of the Automobile Information Disclosure Act of 1958
Daniel Patrick Moynihan (1927–2003), U.S. Senator, ambassador to India, Ambassador to the United Nations
Donald Lee "Don" Nickles (born 1948), U.S. Senator from Oklahoma 1981–2005
George Nigh (born 1927), two-time Governor of Oklahoma
Tony Perkins (born 1963), director of the Family Research Council and former member of the Louisiana House of Representatives
Riley L. Pitts (1937–1967), U.S. Army Medal of Honor recipient
Dennis Reimer (born 1939), four-star General, Chief of Staff of the U.S. Army
Alice Mary Robertson (1854–1931), educator, social worker, government official, and politician
Apollo Soucek (1897–1955), test pilot and Vice Admiral, U. S. Navy, born in Medford, Oklahoma
Gene Stipe (1926–2012), longest-serving member of the Oklahoma State Senate, from McAlester, Oklahoma
Clarence L. Tinker (1887–1942), Air Force major general killed in action in World War II
Elizabeth Warren (born 1949), US Senator for Massachusetts, Special Advisor for the Consumer Financial Protection Bureau
J.C. Watts (born 1957), former U.S. representative in the majority leadership; OU Sooners quarterback
Neil Woodward (born 1962), Naval officer, former NASA astronaut
Jim Woolsey (born 1941), former Director of Central Intelligence and head of the CIA (1993–1995)

Musicians

AleXa (born 1996), K-Pop idol based in Seoul
Hoyt Axton (1938–1999), country music singer-songwriter, wrote "Never Been to Spain"
Chet Baker (1929–1988), jazz trumpeter who helped popularize 1950s cool jazz style
Molly Bee (1939–2009), country singer
Florence Birdwell (1924-2021), voice teacher to Broadway stars
Elvin Bishop (born 1942), singer-songwriter; from Tulsa; hit record "Fooled Around and Fell in Love"
Bob Bogle (1934–2009), bassist and founding member of The Ventures, member of Rock and Roll Hall of Fame
Earl Bostic (1913–1965), R&B and jazz musician
Garth Brooks (born 1962), country music singer-songwriter
Anita Jane Bryant (born 1940), singer, former Miss Oklahoma
Don Byas (1912–1972), jazz tenor saxophonist; a leading musician of swing and bebop eras
JJ Cale (1938–2013), country rock (see Tulsa sound)
Jerry Cantrell (born 1966), musician, lead guitarist and vocalist, Alice in Chains
Henson Cargill (1941–2007), country music singer
Gary Chapman (born 1957), Contemporary Christian musician
Charlie Christian (1916–1942), jazz guitarist, member of Rock and Roll Hall of Fame, considered father of jazz guitar
Roy Clark (1933–2018), country musician
Wayne Coyne (born 1961), member, indie rock band The Flaming Lips
Jesse Ed Davis (Kiowa-Comanche, 1944–1988), Taj Mahal band, session musician post-Beatles, born in Norman
Bob Dunn (1908–1971), musician, invented electric guitar; from Beggs, Oklahoma
Ronnie Dunn (born 1953), half of country music duo Brooks & Dunn
Nokie Edwards (1935–2018), lead guitarist of The Ventures, member of Rock and Roll Hall of Fame
Gail Farrell (born 1947), singer-songwriter, featured performer from The Lawrence Welk Show
John Fullbright (born 1988), singer-songwriter; from Bearden
David Gates (born 1940), singer-songwriter associated with the band Bread
Vince Gill (born 1957), country musician
Earl Grant (1933–1970), easy listening pianist
Woody Guthrie (1912–1967), folk singer
Isaac Hanson (born 1980), guitarist and singer-songwriter from band Hanson
Taylor Hanson (born 1983), pianist and lead singer-songwriter from band Hanson
Zac Hanson (born 1985), drummer and singer-songwriter from band Hanson
Glen Hardin (born 1939), musician, piano player
Roy Harris (1898–1979), classical composer
Richard Hart (born 1955), jazz guitarist, composer, arranger, published artist
Wade Hayes (born 1969), Country Music Artist 
Lee Hazlewood (1929–2007), singer-songwriter, record producer
Michael Hedges (1953–1997), acoustic guitarist, born in Enid, Oklahoma
Wanda Jackson (born 1938), rockabilly singer, born in Maud, Oklahoma
Brett James (born 1968), country singer-songwriter
Toby Keith (born 1961), country musician
Barney Kessel (1923–2004), jazz guitarist
Merle Kilgore (1934–2005), singer-songwriter, manager
Edward Knight (born 1961), composer, music educator
Tosca Kramer (1903–1976), violinist, violist, music educator
Fredell Lack (1922–2017), violinist
Mel McDaniel (1942–2011), country music singer-songwriter
Reba McEntire (born 1955), country singer
Susie McEntire (born 1957), inspirational country singer and storyteller
Jay McShann (1916–2006), jazz pianist and bandleader
Roger Miller (1936–1992), singer-songwriter
Leona Mitchell (born 1948), African-American soprano; Grammy Award winner, member, Oklahoma Music Hall of Fame

N–Z
Norma Jean (born Norma Jean Beasler in 1938), country music singer
Jamie Oldaker (1951–2020), rock n roll drummer
Patti Page (1927–2013), traditional pop music and country music singer
Sandi Patty (born 1957), contemporary Christian music singer2004)
Tom Paxton (born 1937), singer-songwriter
Ben Rector (born 1986), pop singer-songwriter
Steve Ripley (1950–2019), songwriter, studio engineer, guitarist, and inventor, leader of rock band The Tractors
Tyson Ritter (born 1984), vocalist of rock band The All-American Rejects
Sam Rivers (1923–2011), jazz tenor saxophonist with Miles Davis, Dizzy Gillespie, Herbie Hancock, and Quincy Jones
Joe Don Rooney (born 1975), country music singer, one-third of group Rascal Flatts
Leon Russell (1942–2016), singer-songwriter, pianist and guitarist
Jacob Sartorius (born 2002), popular singer on YouTube and Music.ly
Neal Schon (born 1954), lead rock guitarist of Journey
Mark Selby (1961–2017), blues rock musician
Blake Shelton (born 1976), country musician
John Simmons (1918–1979), jazz bassist
Kay Starr (1922–2016), pop and jazz singer
Ryan Tedder (born 1979), frontman, pop rock band OneRepublic
B. J. Thomas (1942–2021), singer-songwriter (singer of "Raindrops Keep Fallin' on My Head")
Carrie Underwood (born 1983), country music singer-songwriter, American Idol 2005 winner
Kitt Wakeley Grammy Nominated musician, Born, Holdenville, OK
Jimmy Webb (born 1946), popular music composer
Bryan White (born 1974), country music singer
Claude Williams (1908–2004), jazz musician, Count Basie band
Mason Williams (born 1938), composer ("Classical Gas"), recording artist, comedy writer (Smothers Brothers)
Bob Wills (1905–1975), country music singer-songwriter, leader of band The Texas Playboys
Austin Winkler (born 1981), former lead singer for rock band Hinder
Sheb Wooley (1921–2003), actor and singer (Purple People Eater)

Native Americans

Bill Anoatubby (born 1945), Governor of the Chickasaw Nation
Lisa Johnson Billy (born 1967), Oklahoma State Legislator; first Woman Native American elected to HD 42; one of the founders of the Native American Caucus; Chickasaw Indian
Black Kettle (1801/07–1868), Cheyenne Chief killed near Cheyenne, Oklahoma, in Roger Mills County
T.C. Cannon (Kiowa/Caddo, 1946–1978), 20th-century Native American artist and poet
Yvonne Chouteau (Shawnee Tribe, 1929–2016), prima ballerina, youngest dancer ever accepted to Ballet Russe de Monte Carlo 
Joseph J. Clark (Cherokee Nation, 1893–1971), Admiral in U.S. Navy
George W. Harkins (Choctaw (1810–1861), attorney, judge, Chief of the Apukshunnubbee District
Wilma Mankiller (1945–2010), first woman Principal Chief of the Cherokee Nation
Doris McLemore (Wichita, 1927–2016), last speaker of the Wichita language
Quanah Parker (Comanche, c. late 1840s–1911), chief and cofounder of the Native American Church
Peter Pitchlynn (Choctaw, 1806–1881), provisional Choctaw Chief, Choctaw Delegate to Washington, D.C.; buried in the Congressional Cemetery 
Pleasant Porter (Muscogee, 1840–1907), Muscogee (Creek) Nation principal chief
Harvey Pratt (Southern Cheyenne, born 1941), Native American forensic artist, Cheyenne peace chief
Will Rogers (Cherokee, 1879–1935), humorist, actor, author, aviator, movie producer
John Ross (Cherokee, 1790–1866), principal chief of the Cherokee Nation, buried at Park Hill, Oklahoma
Steve Russell (born 1947), Cherokee, poet, academic (emeritus professor), journalist and trial judge.
Sequoyah (Cherokee, 1776–1842), lived in what is now Sequoyah County; blacksmith, teacher, inventor of the Cherokee syllabary
Maria Tallchief (Osage Nation, 1925–2013), first American prima ballerina
Marjorie Tallchief (Osage Nation, 1926-2021), ballerina
Clarence L. Tinker (Osage Nation, 1887–1942), U.S. Army Air Corps general, first American general to die in World War II
Fred Waite (Chickasaw, 1853–1895), cowboy, member of Billy the Kid's gang and politician
Della Warrior (Otoe-Missouria, born 1946), first female chairperson of the Otoe-Missouria Tribe of Indians, president of the Institute of American Indian Arts, executive director of the Museum of Indian Arts and Culture
Stand Watie (Cherokee, 1806–1871), Brigadier General in the Confederate Army, chief

Radio and television personalities

Rick Bayless (born 1953), chef and television personality
Skip Bayless (born 1951), sports journalist
Douglas Edwards (1917–1990), radio and television journalist
Gary England (born 1939), chief meteorologist for KWTV Channel 9
Kathy Lee Gifford (born 1953), television personality, Oral Roberts graduate
Kayne Gillaspie (born 1979), television personality and fashion designer
Mary Hart (born 1950), television personality, co-host of Entertainment Tonight
Paul Harvey (1918–2009), radio broadcaster and commentator
Glenn Hauser (born 1945), radio broadcaster
Phil McGraw (born 1950), television psychologist
Bill Moyers (born 1934), television journalist
Bob Murphy (1924–2004), sportscaster, play-by-play for New York Mets
Ross Porter (born 1938), longtime broadcaster for Los Angeles Dodgers
Dan Rowan (1922–1987), comedian, Rowan & Martin's Laugh-In
Reed Timmer (born 1980), television personality, Storm Chasers
Judy Woodruff (born 1946), television journalist

Scientists, including medicine

 Richard E. Berendzen (born 1938), astronomer, author, and professor
 Kenneth H. Cooper (born 1931), physician, United States Air Force officer, pioneer of aerobics
 David Deming (born 1954), PhD, author, professor of geology, and political commentator
 Edwin R. Gilliland (1909–1973), chemical engineer and professor
 Lyle Goodhue (1903–1981), research chemist and inventor
 Karl Guthe Jansky (1905–1950), physicist and radio engineer
 Dr. Donna J. Nelson (born 1954), OU Chemistry Professor, 2016 ACS President, and science advisor to Breaking Bad
 John York (born 1949), cancer research pathologist

Religious figures

 Wade Burleson (born 1961), Lead Pastor of Emmanuel Enid (1992–present) and President of the Baptist General Convention of Oklahoma (2002–2004)
 Finis Alonzo Crutchfield (1916–1987), Methodist minister and Bishop of Oklahoma
 Paul Vernon Galloway (1904–1990), Methodist minister and Bishop of Texas, Arkansas and Louisiana
 Jerry Johnston (born 1959), Southern Baptist clergyman and university administrator, born in Oklahoma City
 Charles William Kerr (1875–1951), first permanent Protestant minister in Tulsa, Oklahoma
 Robert McGill Loughridge (1809–1900), Presbyterian missionary
 Quanah Parker (Comanche, 1852–1911), Native American Church leader and advocate
 Oral Roberts (1918–2009), evangelist
 Stanley Rother (1935–1981), First U.S.-born priest and martyr to be beatified by Roman Catholic church
 John Wilson (Caddo) (ca. 1840–1901), Native American Church roadman
 Yahweh ben Yahweh (born Hulon Mitchell Jr.) (1935–2007), leader of religious group Nation of Yahweh

Visual artists 

Joe Andoe (born 1955), painter
Fred Beaver (Seminole/Muscogee, 1911–1980), painter, printmaker
Charles Bell (1935–1995), photorealist painter
Acee Blue Eagle (Muscogee, 1907–1959), artist
Carolyn Brady (1937–2005), artist
Joe Brainard (1942–1994), artist
T.C. Cannon (Kiowa/Caddo, 1946–1978), artist
Larry Clark (born 1943), photographer, filmmaker
Woody Crumbo (Citizen Potawatomi, 1912–1989), artist
Joe Goode (born 1937), artist
Chester Gould (1900–1985), creator of the Dick Tracy comic strip
Stephen Hillenburg (1961–2018), cartoonist, creator of SpongeBob SquarePants
Allan Houser (Chiricahua Apache, 1914–1994), sculptor
 Robert McMurtry (1950–2012), painter, author
Jason Nelson (born 1970), internet artist and digital poet
Gary Panter (born 1950), illustrator, painter and designer
Joe A. Rector (1935–2012), artist
Ed Ruscha (born 1937), artist
David Salle (born 1952), artist
Leon Polk Smith (European-American, 1906–1996), artist

Other

Bobby Baldwin (born c. 1950), professional poker player
Daniel J. Boorstin (1914–2004), historian, professor, attorney, and writer
Tom Colbert (born 1949), first African-American Oklahoma Supreme Court Justice
Kim Davenport (born 1955), professional pool player
David Duke (born 1950), white nationalist, politician, antisemitic conspiracy theorist
Ben Graf Henneke (1914–1999), educator; president, University of Tulsa
Anita Hill (born 1956), professor of social policy, law, and women's studies who testified at the U.S. Senate confirmation hearings of Clarence Thomas
Sherri Hill (born 1949), fashion designer; grew up in Minco
Ray William Johnson (born 1981), Internet comedian and musician
Stephen Jones (born 1940), attorney; Timothy McVeigh's lead defense lawyer during McVeigh's trial for the Oklahoma City bombing
Robert L. Lynn (1931–2020), college administrator and president, journalist and poet; reared in Carter County
Charles ("Chuck") W. Mooney Jr. (born 1947), the Charles A. Heimbold Jr. Professor of Law, and former interim dean, at the University of Pennsylvania Law School
 Charles Page (1860–1920), philanthropist and founder of Sand Springs, Oklahoma
Joe Redington (1917–1999), "Father of the Iditarod Trail Sled Dog Race"
Bass Reeves (1838–1910), first African-American U.S. Marshal and one of the chief law enforcement agents in early Oklahoma
Kevin Samuels (born 1966), Youtuber
Steven W. Taylor (born 1949), Oklahoma Supreme Court Justice, presided over Oklahoma City bombing suspect Terry Nichols's state murder trial
Cornel West (born 1953), scholar
 Kathleen Zellner, attorney

See also

 List of Northeastern State University alumni
 List of Oklahoma State University people
 List of people from Enid, Oklahoma
 List of people from Muskogee, Oklahoma
 List of people from Norman, Oklahoma
 List of people from Oklahoma City
 List of people from Tulsa, Oklahoma
 List of University of Central Oklahoma people
 List of University of Oklahoma people
 List of University of Tulsa people
 Lists of Americans

References